The Primitive Methodist Church is a Methodist Christian denomination within the holiness movement. It began in England in the early 19th century, with the influence of American evangelist Lorenzo Dow (1777–1834).

In the United States, the Primitive Methodist Church had eighty-three parishes and 8,487 members in 1996. In Great Britain and Australia, the Primitive Methodist Church merged with other denominations, to form the Methodist Church of Great Britain in 1932 and the Methodist Church of Australasia in 1901. The latter subsequently merged into the Uniting Church in Australia in 1977.

History

United Kingdom 

The leaders who originated Primitive Methodism were attempting to restore a spirit of revivalism as they felt was found in the ministry of John Wesley, with no intent of forming a new church. The leaders were Hugh Bourne (1772–1852) and William Clowes (1780–1851), preachers in the Wesleyan Methodist Church. Bourne had joined a Methodist society at Burslem, but business taking him at the close of 1800 to the colliery district of Harriseahead and Kidsgrove, he was so impressed by the prevailing ignorance that he began a religious revival of the district, and Clowes joined him in 1805.

The two preachers heard from Lorenzo Dow of the results of American camp meetings, and held a fourteen-hour camp meeting on May 31, 1807, at Mow Cop on the Staffordshire and Cheshire border, which resulted in many converts. But the Wesleyan Church refused to admit these converts to the church, and reprimanded Bourne and Clowes. Refusing to cease holding open-air meetings, they were dismissed from the church. For a while they took separate paths, but after waiting two years for readmittance to the church, they founded the Primitive Methodists in the year of 1810. Clowes's personality drew a number of strong men after him, and a society meeting held in a kitchen and then in a warehouse became the nucleus of a circuit, a chapel being built at Tunstall in July 1811, and there in February 1812 they took the name The Society of the Primitive Methodists. The name is meant to indicate they were conducting themselves in the way of Wesley and the "original" Methodists, particularly in reference to open-air meetings and allowing female ministry. The last of the women roving preachers died in 1890.

Primitive Methodist workers played an important role in the formative phase of the Trade Union movement in England. They were always the most working class of the main Methodist bodies in Great Britain. They also used women at an early date as ministers ("itinerants") and preachers, a notable development in women's emancipation.

The Primitive Methodist Church formed one of the three streams of Methodism then extant in England. In 1932 it merged with the Wesleyan Methodist Church and the United Methodists to form the Methodist Church of Great Britain. The story of Primitive Methodism is kept alive at Englesea Brook, the museum of Primitive Methodism.

United States
The first missionaries to America arrived in Brooklyn, New York, in 1829. The societies founded in the United States were under the control of the British Primitive Methodist Conference until 1840, when the "American Primitive Methodist Church" was established on September 16. A combining of various organizational structures occurred in May 1975, and the current (2004) official name—The Primitive Methodist Church in the United States of America—was chosen.

The denomination holds an annual conference. A president, elected every four years, is the chief leader of the denomination and their headquarters are located in his home. In 2000 the American body had 79 congregations with 4502 members.

Australia
Primitive Methodist congregations were also established in Australia. In 1902 the Primitive Methodist Church, Wesleyan Methodist Church, Bible Christians and the United Methodist Free Churches formed the Methodist Church of Australasia. In 1977 the Methodist Church of Australasia joined with the Congregational Union of Australia and Presbyterian Church of Australia to form the Uniting Church in Australia.

Beliefs
The Primitive Methodist Church recognizes the dominical sacraments of Baptism and Holy Communion, as well as other rites, such as Holy Matrimony.

Missions
The Primitive Methodist Church in the United States has missions in Spain, Guatemala and other countries throughout the world. Its mission work in Africa dates back to 1897 and its mission work in Guatemala was started in 1921.

Ecumenical relations
The Primitive Methodist Church in the United States, with respect to ecumenism, is a member of the Christian Holiness Partnership, an organization of churches in the Wesleyan–Arminian tradition, and a member of the National Association of Evangelicals.

See also

Bible Methodist Connection of Churches
Evangelical Methodist Church of America
Fundamental Methodist Conference, Inc.
Free Methodist Church
Southern Methodist Church

References

Further reading
Petty, John. The History of the Primitive Methodist Connexion : from its origin to the conference of 1860, the first jubilee year of the connexion :  compiled under the direction of the book committee of the denomination, and approved by the conference, London, 1864.
 This contains a detailed history of the church up to 1909.
Handbook of Denominations in the United States, 11th Edition, Frank S. Mead, Samuel S. Hill & Craig D. Atwood  
Religious Congregations & Membership in the United States 2000, ASARB & Glenmary Research Center 
Young, D. M., The great River: Primitive Methodism till 1868 (Stoke-on-Trent: Tentmaker Publications 2016)
Young, D. M., Change and Decay: Primitive Methodism from late Victorian Times till World War 1 (Stoke-on-Trent: Tentmaker Publications 2017)
Young, D. M., The Primitive Methodist Mission to North Wales (Wesley Historical Society, Wales, in association with Tentmaker Publications, Stoke-on-Trent 2016)
www.primitivemethodism.com

External links
Denominational website
Englesea Brook Chapel and Museum of Primitive Methodism
History of the Primitive Methodist Connexion by H. B. Kendall
Hugh Bourne
Website with articles, photos and books on Primitive Methodism past and present
Website of the Primitive Methodist Church in the USA with links to Primitive Methodist churches in other countries

Methodist denominations established in the 19th century
Primitive
1807 establishments in the United Kingdom
Methodist denominations in North America